This is a list of notable past and present residents of the U.S. city of Honolulu, Hawaii, and its surrounding metropolitan area.

Arts

 Satoru Abe, American sculptor and painter
 Jean Charlot, internationally famous French-American painter, muralist, and illustrator
 Tadashi Sato, known for Aquarius, a 36-foot circular mosaic on the floor of the atrium of the Hawaii State Capitol
 Madge Tennent, British-American painter considered the most important contributor to 20th-century Hawaiian art
 Dallas Nagata White, landscape photographer known for "lava kiss"
 Jeff Widener, American photojournalist
 John Chin Young, known for his Zen-like depictions of horses

Athletics

 Robyn Ah Mow-Santos, Olympic silver medalist volleyball player and coach
 Dennis Alexio, kickboxer
 David Amerson, football player, North Carolina State and Washington Redskins cornerback
 Francys Arsentiev, first U.S. woman to reach the summit of Mount Everest without the aid of bottled oxygen
 David Aupiu, football player
 Dino Babers, head football coach for the Syracuse Orange
 Heather Bown, Olympic silver medalist volleyball player
 Byron Chamberlain, NFL player
 Bryan Clay, 2008 Olympic gold medalist for the decathlon 
 Jeff Cobb, Olympian and ROH wrestler
 Buster Crabbe, 1932 Olympic gold medalist and actor (Tarzan, Flash Gordon, and Buck Rogers)
 Ron Darling, MLB pitcher, broadcaster
 Ka'imi Fairbairn, American football player
 Sid Fernandez, MLB pitcher
 Chris Fuamatu-Maʻafala, NFL player
 Kurt Gouveia, NFL player
 Charlie Hough, MLB pitcher
 Mike Huff, MLB pitcher
 Nia Jax, WWE wrestler 
 Duke Kahanamoku, Olympic gold medalist, surfer, actor
 Olin Kreutz, NFL player
 Ashley Lelie, NFL player
 Karl Lorch, NFL player
 Mike Lum, MLB player
 Salvador "Dado" Marino (1915-1989), flyweight boxer who became World flyweight champion in 1950
 Marcus Mariota, NFL player
 Carissa Moore, professional surfer
 Ken Niumatalolo, football coach
 Kenso Nushida (1899–1983), baseball player
 Ed Parker, martial artist, author 
 B.J. Penn, UFC lightweight and welterweight champion
 Max Holloway, former UFC Featherweight Champion
 Dominic Raiola, NFL player
 Nick Rolovich, college football coach
 Kyla Ross, Olympic gold medalist gymnast and member of the Fierce Five
 Lenn Sakata, MLB player
 Teee Sanders, Olympic bronze medalist volleyball player
 Dave Shoji, since 2013, all-time winningest NCAA Division I head volleyball coach
 John Simerson, football player
 Thomas Tamas, sport shooter 
 Manti Teʻo, football player for Notre Dame and San Diego Chargers
 Shane Victorino, MLB World Series champion (2008 Philadelphia Phillies, 2013 Boston Red Sox)
 Michelle Wie, professional golfer
 Milt Wilcox, MLB pitcher
 Jerome Williams, MLB pitcher
 Kim Willoughby, Olympic silver medalist volleyball player
 Bobby Wood, MLS soccer player
 Alexander Cartwright, "Father of Baseball"
 Tua Tagovailoa, NFL player, Miami Dolphins

Business

 Genshiro Kawamoto, billionaire real estate investor
 Stanley Kennedy Sr. founder of Hawaiian Airlines
 Darren Kimura, businessman, founder of Sopogy
 Pierre Omidyar, eBay creator and founder
 William S. Patout, III, sugar grower from Iberia Parish, Louisiana; lived in Honolulu, 1959 to 1960.
 Charles Reed Bishop, businessman, philanthropist, founder of the Bishop Museum
 James Dole, developer of the pineapple industry in Hawaii, namesake of the Dole Food Company

Literature

 Joseph Campbell, writer, lecturer 
 Jack London, author, journalist, and social activist
 Jack Lord, actor
 Lois Lowry, author
 Herman Melville, author
 James A. Michener, Pulitzer Prize-winning novelist
 Janet Mock, author and MSNBC talk show host 
 Robert Louis Stevenson, novelist, poet, essayist and travel writer
 Hunter S. Thompson, journalist and author
 Mark Twain, author
 Kirby Wright, poet and writer

Movies/television/media

 Jacob Batalon, actor
 Sarah Wayne Callies, actress 
 Tia Carrere, singer, actress
 Mark Dacascos, actor, martial artist 
 Denise Dowse, actress and director, Beverly Hills, 90210
 David Gallaher, graphic novelist and comic book author
 Lauren Graham, actress and producer, Gilmore Girls
 Erin Gray, actress, Silver Spoons
 John Halliday, actor
 Kelly Hu, actress, Miss Hawaii Teen USA 1985, Miss Teen USA 1985
 Carrie Ann Inaba, judge, Dancing with the Stars
 Keahu Kahuanui, actor, plays Danny Mahealani in series Teen Wolf on MTV
 Nicole Kidman, Academy Award-winning actress 
 Daniel Dae Kim, actor 
 Clyde Kusatsu, actor
 Lori Matsukawa, television news anchor
 Al Michaels, television sportscaster
 Jason Momoa, actor, director, model
 Jack Mower, actor
 Tahj Mowry, actor 
 Jim Nabors, actor, singer, The Andy Griffith Show, Gomer Pyle, U.S.M.C.
 Timothy Olyphant, actor, Deadwood, Justified
 Maggi Parker, actress, Hawaii Five-O (1968 TV series) 
 Janel Parrish, actress, model, plays Mona in Pretty Little Liars
 Kelly Preston, actress, model
 Maggie Q, actress, Nikita
 Hironobu Sakaguchi, video game director, writer and producer
 James Shigeta, actor
 Karen Steele, actress
 Don Stroud, actor
 Mageina Tovah, actress
 Mark Edward Fischbach, YouTuber known as "Markiplier"
 Kam Fong Chun, actor, Hawaii Five-O (1968 TV series)
 Katija Pevec, actress
 Markiplier, YouTuber

Music

 Anjani, singer-songwriter and pianist
 Yvonne Elliman, popular singer
 Don Ho, popular singer
 Israel "Iz" Kaʻanoʻi Kamakawiwoʻole, Hawaiian musician
 Melody Miyuki Ishikawa, singer
 Bruno Mars, singer-songwriter 
 Glenn Medeiros, singer-songwriter
 James Mercer, frontman of rock band The Shins
 Bette Midler, singer and actress
Kid Ory, jazz musician and bandleader
 Nicole Scherzinger, singer, dancer, model 
 Jake Shimabukuro, ukulele virtuoso
 Hana Shimozumi, light opera singer
 Huening Kai, Korean-American singer in boyband TXT
 Donald Sur, composer and musicologist
Mike Starr, musician, Alice in Chains

Politics
 

 Neil Abercrombie, Governor of Hawaii, 2010-2014
Daniel Akaka, U.S. Senator, first Native Hawaiian Senator in the United States
 George Ariyoshi, 3rd Governor of Hawaii, the first Asian American governor in the United States
 John A. Burns, 2nd Governor of Hawaii
 Jimmy Carter, 39th President of the United States
 Ben Cayetano, Governor of Hawaii 1994-2002
 Nora Stewart Coleman, former First Lady of American Samoa
 Sanford B. Dole, lawyer, jurist, the President of the Republic of Hawaii, and the 1st Territorial Governor of Hawaii
 Tammy Duckworth, United States Senator from Illinois and former U.S. congresswoman representing the 8th Congressional district in Illinois
 Hiram Fong, United States Senator, namesake of the Senator Fong's Plantation & Gardens in Kaneohe
 Mazie Hirono, U.S. Senator from Hawai'i
 Daniel Inouye, Medal of Honor recipient, U.S. Senator, President pro tempore
 Princess Kaʻiulani, crown princess, heir to the throne of the Kingdom of Hawaiʻi 
 King Kalakaua, last reigning king of the Kingdom of Hawaiʻi
 Queen Liliuokalani, last reigning Queen of the Hawaiian Islands
 Oren E. Long, former territorial governor of Hawai'i, one of Hawai'i's first US Senators
 King Lunalilo, King to the Kingdom of Hawaii 
 Ferdinand Marcos, former President of the Philippines
 Patsy Mink, former U.S. congresswoman who co-authored the Title IX Amendment of the Higher Education Act, first Japanese-American woman licensed to practice law in Hawaii
 Barack Obama, 44th President of the United States 
 Sarah Palin, politician, 2008 Republican vice-presidential candidate
 Syngman Rhee, 1st President of South Korea
 Mark Takai, former U.S. Representative
 Lorrin A. Thurston, lawyer, politician in Honolulu early 1900s
 Sun Yat-sen, "Father of the Nation" of the Republic of China, and the "forerunner of democratic revolution" in the People's Republic of China

Miscellaneous

 Judi Andersen, Miss Hawaii USA 1978, Miss USA 1978
 Bernice Pauahi Bishop, Hawaiian princess, philanthropist, aliʻi, and Kamehameha descendant 
 Redmond Burke, heart surgeon 
 Doris Duke, American heiress, socialite, horticulturalist, art collector, and philanthropist
 Ann Dunham, mother of Barack Obama
 Amelia Earhart, American aviation pioneer and author
 Katrina Forest, American microbiologist and structural biology pioneer.
 Charles Irving Elliott aviation pioneer
 Marcus "Dyrus" Hill, League of Legends professional player
 Willi Hennig, biologist
 Brook Lee, Miss Hawaii USA 1997, Miss USA 1997, Miss Universe 1997
 Elizabeth Peet McIntosh, OSS agent in WWII
 Megan McClung, first female United States Marine Corps officer killed in combat during the Iraq War
 Harry T.L. Pang, posthumous Purple Heart recipient killed during the surprise attack on Pearl Harbor while serving with the Honolulu Fire Department
 James Mahmud Rice, sociologist
 David C. Schutter, attorney and activist
 Winfield W. Scott Jr., United States Army Lieutenant General
 Charles L. Veach, American astronaut
 Ehren Watada, United States Army Lieutenant who refused to deploy to Iraq
 Macel Wilson, Miss Hawaii USA 1962, Miss USA 1962
 Tanya Wilson, Miss Hawaii USA 1972, Miss USA 1972
 Danny Yamashiro, American clergyman, researcher, and religious broadcaster

References 

 
Honolulu
Honolulu